Godelleta is a municipality in the comarca of Hoya de Buñol in the Valencian Community, Spain.

Notable people
Fermín Zanón (1875–1944), zoologist.

Images

References

Municipalities in the Province of Valencia
Hoya de Buñol